Walytjatjata (also spelled Walytjatjara) is a place in the Northern Territory of Australia that is culturally important to the Pitjantjatjara Aboriginal community. It is surrounded to the north by the western hills of the Mann Ranges. An outstation was built here in the 1980s, although nobody currently lives there permanently. The houses there are sometimes used for hunting, foraging, painting and cultural events.

The name  refers to something having an owner in Pitjantjatjara.

References

External links
Walytjatjata on the Northern Territory Place Names Register

Geography of the Northern Territory
Indigenous Australian communities
Pitjantjatjara
Waterholes of Australia